Survival & Other Stories is the fourteenth solo album by former Yes singer Jon Anderson, released in spring 2011.

On his website, Anderson had invited anyone to send mp3 samples as a basis for collaboration. Much of this material led to the content of Survival & Other Stories. The song "Just One Man" also features on the Anderson/Wakeman album The Living Tree (2010).

Tracks

Production
Produced by Jon & Jane Anderson
Stefan Podell: orchestration (6)
Ryan Fraley: orchestration (9)
Christophe Lebled: soundscape (9)
Daniel Reinker: viola (9)
Mixed with the help of Patrick MacDougall
Package design by Jay Nungesser
Mastered by Mike Pietrini

References

2011 albums
Jon Anderson albums